Douven is a Dutch surname. Notable people with the name include:

 Jan Frans van Douven (1656–1727), Southern Netherlandish portrait painter
 Igor Douven, philosopher, cognitive psychologist and formal epistemologist
 Rudy Douven (born 1961), Dutch chess master

Dutch-language surnames